The airport novel represents a literary genre that is defined not so much by its plot or cast of stock characters, as by the social function it serves. Designed to meet the demands of a very specific market, airport novels are superficially engaging while not being necessarily profound as they are usually written to be more entertaining than philosophically challenging. An airport novel is typically a fairly long but fast-paced boilerplate genre-fiction novel commonly offered by airport newsstands, "read for pace and plot, not elegance of phrasing".

Considering the marketing of fiction as a trade, airport novels occupy a niche similar to the one that once was occupied by pulp magazines and other reading materials typically sold at newsstands and kiosks to travellers. In French, such novels are called romans de gare, 'railway station novels', suggesting that publishers in France were aware of this potential market at a very early date. The somewhat dated Dutch term stationsroman is a calque from French.

Format
Airport novels are typically quite long; a book that a reader finished before the journey was done would similarly be unsatisfying. Because of this length, the genre attracts prolific authors, who use their output as a sort of branding; each author is identified with a certain sort of story, and produces many variations of the same thing.  Well-known authors' names are usually in type larger than the title on the covers of airport novels, often in embossed letters.

Themes
Airport novels typically fall within a number of other fiction genres, including:

 Crime fiction
 Detective fiction
 Historical romance
 Spy fiction
 Thrillers

Whatever the genre, the books must be fast-paced and easy to read.  The description "airport novel" is mildly pejorative; it implies that the book has little lasting value, and is useful chiefly as an inexpensive form of entertainment during travel.  Airport novels are sometimes contrasted with literary fiction, so that a novel with literary aspirations would be disparaged by the label.

History
Early in the history of rail transport in Great Britain, as longer trips became more common, travelers wanted to read more than newspapers. Railway station newsstands began selling inexpensive books, what The Times in 1851 described as "French novels, unfortunately, of questionable character". Sales were so high that Athenaeum in 1849 predicted that railway newsstands might replace traditional bookstores.

By 1851, WH Smith had about 35 bookstores in British railway stations. Although Athenaeum reported that year that the company "maintain[ed] the dignity of literature by resolutely refusing to admit pernicious publications", The Times—noting the enormous success of The Parlour Library—surmised that "persons of the better class, who constitute the larger portion of railway readers, lose their accustomed taste the moment they smell the engine and present themselves to the railway librarian".

Writers of airport novels
Writers whose books have been described as airport novels include:

 Jeffrey Archer
 David Baldacci
 Peter Benchley
 Dan Brown
 Lee Child
 Suzanne Collins
 Michael Crichton
 Tom Clancy
 Clive Cussler
 Robert P. Davis
 Ian Fleming
 Vince Flynn
 Frederick Forsyth
 John Grisham
 Arthur Hailey
 Thomas Harris
 E.L. James
 Stephen King
 Stieg Larsson
 Robert Ludlum
 Andy McNab
 Stephenie Meyer
 James Patterson
 Jodi Picoult
 Matthew Reilly
 Chris Ryan
 Nicholas Sparks
 Danielle Steel
 Gérard de Villiers

In popular culture
The animated television series The Simpsons included a joke in the episode "The Joy of Sect" (airdate February 8, 1998), in which an airport bookstore is named "JUST CRICHTON AND KING".  Hans Moleman asks, "Do you have anything by Robert Ludlum?" and is told by the clerk to get out.

See also

 Potboiler
 Yellow-back

References

External links
 
  Mike Rozak contemplates the difference between airport novels and classic novels.

Literary genres
Books by type
Book terminology
Aviation mass media